Mount Tenney is a mountain located west of Latady Mountains, 9 nautical miles (17 km) northwest of Mount Hyatt, at the base of Antarctic Peninsula. Mapped by United States Geological Survey (USGS) from surveys and U.S. Navy air photos, 1961–67. Named by Advisory Committee on Antarctic Names (US-ACAN) for Philip J. Tenney, traverse engineer on the South Pole—Queen Maud Land Traverse III, summer 1967–68.

Mountains of Palmer Land